Maya is a 2018 French drama film directed by Mia Hansen-Løve. It was screened in the Special Presentations section at the 2018 Toronto International Film Festival.

Cast
Roman Kolinka as Gabriel Dahan
Aarshi Banerjee as Maya
Suzan Anbeh as Sigrid
Judith Chemla as Naomi
Alex Descas as Frédéric
Johanna ter Steege as Johanna

References

External links

2018 films
2018 drama films
French drama films
2010s French-language films
Films directed by Mia Hansen-Løve
Films set in Goa
Films set in Mumbai
Films shot in Goa
Films shot in Jordan
Films shot in Paris
Prisoner of war films
2010s English-language films
2010s French films